In mathematics, the Chinese monoid is a monoid generated by a totally ordered alphabet with the relations cba = cab = bca for every a ≤ b ≤ c. An algorithm similar to Schensted's algorithm yields characterisation of the equivalence classes and a cross-section theorem. It was discovered by  during their classification of monoids with growth similar to that of the plactic monoid, and studied in detail by Julien Cassaigne, Marc Espie, Daniel Krob, Jean-Christophe Novelli, and Florent Hivert in 2001.

The Chinese monoid has a regular language cross-section

and hence polynomial growth of dimension .

See Also 
 Plactic monoid

References

 

Combinatorics
Semigroup theory